, also known as Tonight, at the Movies, is a Japanese romantic-fantasy film starring Haruka Ayase and Kentaro Sakaguchi, with original screenplay by Keisuke Uyama and direction by Hideki Takeuchi. It premiered in Japan on  10 February 2018.

Synopsis
The  film follows the story of a young filmmaker named Kenji (Sakaguchi) and a heroine from a black and white film called Princess Miyuki (Ayase). As an aspiring director, Kenji dreamed of meeting his favourite star of the bygone '60s retro film, Princess Miyuki. Kenji is attracted to Miyuki, who appears in monochrome while he resides in the colorful real world. Through a bizarre twist of fate, Miyuki jumps out of the silver screen and joins Kenji in a world filled with colour—and she's even ballsy off screen.

Cast

Main
Haruka Ayase as Miyuki	
Kentaro Sakaguchi as Kenji

Supporting
Tsubasa Honda as Toko Naruse	
Kazuki Kitamura as Ryunosuke Shundo	
Akiyoshi Nakao as Shintaro Yamanaka	
Anna Ishibashi
Tokuma Nishioka
Akira Emoto as Tadashi Honda 
Go Kato as old Kenji

Reception

Box office
The film was premiered in 298 screens and opened at #1 in the box office with 193,000 admissions. By its seventh week, it had earned ¥1 billion domestically.

Adaptations
In January 2022 the film was adapted by the Takarazuka revue for the stage. A moon troupe production, the play was led by current moon troupe stars Kanato Tsukishiro as Kenji, and Mitsuki Umino as Miyuki.

References

External links
  

Tonight, at the Movies on Eiga

2018 films
2010s Japanese-language films
Japanese romantic drama films
Japanese fantasy films
2010s romantic fantasy films
2010s Japanese films